"The Song Is You" is a popular song from 1932 by Jerome Kern and Oscar Hammerstein II.

The Song Is You may also refer to:
The Song Is You (Frank Sinatra album), 1994
The Song Is You (Stan Getz album), 1996
The Song Is You, a 2014 album by Jennifer Holliday
The Song Is You, a 2009 novel by Arthur Phillips

See also 
The Song Is June!, a 1958 album by June Christy which includes a cover version of "The Song Is You"